Jacques Aldo Wanemut (born 2 February 1992) is a Vanuatuan footballer who plays as a defender for Erakor Golden Star in the Port Vila Football League. He made his debut for the national team on March 25, 2016 in their 1–0 victory against New Caledonia.

References

External links
 

1992 births
Living people
Vanuatuan footballers
Association football defenders
Vanuatu international footballers
Erakor Golden Star F.C. players
2016 OFC Nations Cup players